Marek Stachowski (born 1957) is a Polish linguist and etymologist specializing in Turkic languages, especially Yakut, Dolgan and Turkish. He is a professor at Jagiellonian University and the founding editor of the historical linguistics journal Studia Etymologica Cracoviensia.

He has published nine books and more than 200 articles on Turkic, Mongolic, Yeniseian, Tungusic and some European languages. He publishes in English, German and Polish.

Main works
Stachowski, Marek 1993. Dolganischer Wortschatz, Kraków, 264 p.
Stachowski, Marek 1993. Geschichte des jakutischen Vokalismus. Kraków, 208 p.
Stachowski, Marek 1995. Studien zum Wortschatz der jakutischen Übersetzung des Neuen 
Testaments, Kraków, 63 p.
Stachowski, Marek 1997. Dolganische Wortbildung, Kraków, 124 p.
Stachowski, Marek 1998. Dolganischer Wortschatz – Supplementband, Kraków, 282 p.
Stachowski, Marek 1999. Konsonantenadaptation russischer Lehnwörter im Dolganischen, Kraków, 
140 p.
Stachowski, Marek 2007. Gramatyka języka tureckiego w zarysie, 1st edition, Kraków, 407 p.
Stachowski, Marek 2009. Gramatyka języka tureckiego w zarysie, 2nd revised edition, Kraków, 
407 p.
Stachowski, Marek 2011. Etimoloji, Ankara, X + 118 p.

References

External links
http://www2.filg.uj.edu.pl/ifo/kjasis/~stachowski.marek/
https://jagiellonian.academia.edu/MarekStachowski
List of publications

Linguists from Poland
Living people
Etymologists
1957 births